"Shadowboxer" is a song written and performed by American alternative singer-songwriter Fiona Apple. It was released on 
July 1, 1996 by Work Records and Columbia Records as her debut single from her debut studio album, Tidal.

Background and release 
Apple recorded the song with collaborator Jon Brion in 1995 immediately after being signed to a record deal with Sony Music Entertainment. Its lyrical content mainly explores the themes of the dangers of desire and vulnerability. It was then released as her debut and lead single from her forthcoming debut studio album on July 1, 1996. A music video of the song directed by Jim Gable was released. Apple performed "Shadowboxer" in various events, most notably during the 22nd season of Saturday Night Live and on the television special MTV Unplugged: Fiona Apple.

Music video 
Shot entirely in black-and-white, this takes place in a recording studio, with scenes of her playing the piano and in Fostex T20RP headphones singing in front of a microphone.

Chart performance 
The song charted inside the Top 40 of two different Billboard charts. It spent six weeks on the Alternative Songs chart, peaking at number 34. It fared much better on the Adult Pop Songs, peaking at number 32 and spent over 15 weeks on the chart.

Critical reception 
"Shadowboxer" has received critical acclaim from music critics, with many of them comparing Apple's voice to Nina Simone and her lyrical talent to Carole King. Steven Mirkin of Entertainment Weekly gave the song an A−, he wrote, "Singing to a former lover, her slurred, smoky vocals float above a loping, gospel-tinged piano, vibes, and string arrangement, making her "Shadowboxer" sound like Nina Simone covering early Elton John. Although she's only 18, she has the poise of a seasoned singer." Stephen Thomas Erlewine of AllMusic described the song as "haunting", remarking that while "it strives to say something deep and important, much of the lyrics settle for clichés."

Track listing 
CD single
"Shadowboxer" – 5:26
"Never Is a Promise" – 5:56

Maxi single
"Shadowboxer" (radio edit)
"Shadowboxer" (album version)
"Never Is a Promise"
"Carrion" (Live)

Personnel 
Credits adapted from the liner notes of Tidal;
Bass guitar – Greg Richling
Drums – Danny Frankel
Chamberlin – Patrick Warren
Vibraphone, tack piano – Jon Brion
Vocals, piano – Fiona Apple

Charts

Release history

References 

1996 debut singles
Columbia Records singles
Fiona Apple songs
1996 songs
Songs written by Fiona Apple
1990s ballads
Black-and-white music videos